Shiflett may refer to:

Chris Shiflett (born 1971), lead guitarist for the rock band Foo Fighters
Scott Shiflett (1966), bassist
Shiflett Brothers, Texas-based sculptors working in the comic book and gaming industries

See also
Chris Shiflett & the Dead Peasants, the debut self-titled album from Chris Shiflett, lead guitarist of Foo Fighters